Hutufeideria is a genus of tortoise mites in the family Uropodidae. There are at least three described species in Hutufeideria.

Species
These three species belong to the genus Hutufeideria:
 Hutufeideria phuketensis
 Hutufeideria singaporensis Hirschmann & Hiramatsu, 1977
 Hutufeideria thailandica

References

Uropodidae
Articles created by Qbugbot